The Saab Viking is a concept car designed by the Italian company Carrozzeria Fissore and presented in 1982.  The concept was designed by Tom Tjaarda. The Viking is based on a Saab 900 Turbo chassis.

References 

Saab concept vehicles
Cars introduced in 1982